Rhodocactus grandifolius (rose cactus; syn. Pereskia grandifolia) is a species of cactus native to eastern and southern Brazil. Like all species in the genus Rhodocactus and unlike most cacti, it has persistent leaves. It was first described in 1819. It is grown as an ornamental plant and has naturalized outside its native range.

Description
Although Rhodocactus grandifolius is a cactus by classification, it takes the form of a shrub or small tree,  in height, exceptionally . Young twigs are green or reddish with conspicuous white spots marking the stomata. The areoles are rounded, cushion-shaped, and with grayish or brownish tomentum. The areoles can have one to three or occasionally four leaves (brachyblast leaves) in addition to spines. They are entire, with shapes ranging from elliptic to ovate and obovate-lanceolate. The dense inflorescence develops at the ends of stems and also laterally from the areoles of upper parts of the main shoots and twigs. It usually has 10-15 flowers, but sometimes has 30 or more. The fruit is very variable in size and shape, and is green, yellowish or reddish-green when ripe. It contains many glossy black seeds.

Taxonomy
The species was first described by Adrian Hardy Haworth in 1819 as Pereskia grandifolia. It was transferred to Rhodocactus as R. grandifolius by Frederik Marcus Knuth in 1936. However, this was not accepted by most botanists, and Rhodocactus was sunk into a broadly circumscribed Pereskia. Molecular phylogenetic studies from 2005 onwards suggested that with this circumscription, Pereskia was not monophyletic, and consisted of three clades. In 2016, the genus Rhodocactus was revived for one of these clades, which included R. grandifolius.

Varieties
Two varieties are accepted:
Rhodocactus grandifolius var. grandifolius is distinguished by having green bracts and green to pink sepal-like perianth parts.
Rhodocactus grandifolius var. violaceus (Leuenb.) I.Asai & K.Miyata has purplish-pink or purple bracts and sepal-like perianth parts, and somewhat smaller petal-like perianth parts than var. grandifolius. It was discovered sometime before 1972, initially described as Pereskia bahiensis, but is only distinguished by colour.

Distribution
The species as a whole is native to eastern and southern Brazil. It is widely cultivated in other parts of South America, the West Indies and beyond, and has become naturalized in some of these countries, including Vietnam. R. grandifolius var. grandifolius has a similar distribution; R. grandifolius var. violaceus is apparently native to Espírito Santo and Minas Gerais, but is cultivated in neighbouring states.

Uses
Rhodocactus grandifolius is grown as an ornamental plant, appreciated for its flowers. It is also used as a hedge. Its leaves can be eaten as a salad or used in stews.

References

Pereskioideae
Endemic flora of Brazil
Cacti of South America
Flora of Northeast Brazil
Flora of Southeast Brazil
Flora of South Brazil